The Khmelnytskyi Nuclear Power Plant is a nuclear power plant in Netishyn, Khmelnytskyi, Ukraine. The plant is operated by Energoatom. Two VVER-1000 reactors are operational, each generating 1000 MW (net) of electricity. Construction of the first reactor started in 1981 and the first unit was put in operation in late 1987. Construction of the second reactor started in 1983 with plans to finish it in 1991. In 1990, however, construction was stopped as part of a moratorium on new plant construction. Construction was completed only in August 2004 after the moratorium was lifted.

Two more VVER-1000 reactors were under construction: Construction of the third reactor started in September 1985 and the fourth reactor in June 1986. Construction was stopped in 1990 when they were 75% and 28% complete, respectively.  An intergovernmental agreement on the resumption of construction was signed between Ukraine and Russia in June 2010.  On 10 February 2011, Energoatom and Atomstroyexport signed a contract agreement for the completion of reactors 3 and 4. They should have been commissioned in 2018 and 2020, respectively.  Feasibility study of reactors 3 and 4 was conducted by Kyiv Institute Energoproekt.

In September 2015 Ukrainian government (Second Yatsenyuk Government) decided to terminate the agreement with Russia on the completion of the Khmelnytsky NPP power units. This was confirmed on 12 May 2016.
Reason was the Russo-Ukrainian War begun by Russia in 2014 (intensified since February 2022).
In August 2016 an agreement with Korea Hydro & Nuclear Power was made to assist with the completion of reactors 3 and 4, but little progress was made. As of 2020 a Ukrainian working group was assessing the safety of the old cranes on the site needed to progress construction work.

Khmelnytskyi Nuclear Power Plant is the start of the deactivated Rzeszów–Khmelnytskyi powerline, one of three 750 kV lines running from Ukraine to the European Union.

Energoatom are considering disconnecting unit 2 from the Ukrainian power grid and connecting it to the Burshtyn TES energy island which operates on the European power grid, to facilitate exports to Poland and Hungary. In 2019 the Ministry of Energy created a consortium, Ukraine Power Bridge Company Limited, to progress the project, but as of 2020 the project was not agreed.

In late November 2021, Energoatom and Westinghouse Electric agreed on a contract to construct the first Westinghouse AP1000 reactor in Ukraine at the Khmelnytskyi plant.

In May of 2022, Energoatom stated that the war and occupations of other power stations had not changed their ambitions to construct these units. They are still working with Westinghouse to construct two AP1000 reactors at the site once the war is over.

See also 

 Nuclear power in Ukraine
 Energoatom

References

External links 
 
 History of KhNPP

Nuclear power stations in Ukraine
Nuclear power stations built in the Soviet Union
Nuclear power stations using pressurized water reactors
Nuclear power stations using VVER reactors
Energoatom